Georgia Writers (GW) is a nonprofit 501(c)(3) organization that works across the state to encourage and strengthen the proficiencies of writers in both the creative and business aspects of the writing life, and to provide networking opportunities for writers through regularly scheduled meetings and events.

Organization and activities
Georgia Writers is hosted by Kennesaw State University and sponsors workshops, conferences, seminars, contests, and other events while encouraging the formation of satellite groups, critique groups and other writer resource groups. The organization is supported by and located at the Kennesaw State University College of Humanities and Social Sciences under the executive directorship of Jenny Sadre-Orafai. 

The intended role of the GW at Kennesaw State University is to encourage the education of writers from all backgrounds including teachers, independent writers, and students. Some GW events are in cooperation with Kennesaw Mountain Writing Project and the Master of Arts in Professional Writing at Kennesaw State University. The association is also supported in part by the Georgia Council for the Arts (GCA)  through the appropriations of the Georgia General Assembly and its partner agency, the National Endowment for the Arts .

Founding
GW was founded in 1994 by Geri Taran - a poet, writer, and artist - with prize-winning author and Professor of Creative Writing Anthony “Tony” Grooms, and literary agent Susan L. Graham. Ms. Taran served as the executive director of the organization until July 1, 2006; the GW is now directed by Jenny Sadre-Orafai, Professor of English at Kennesaw State University.

Georgia Author of the Year Awards (GAYA)
GW recognizes Georgia's authors of excellence by hosting the Georgia Author of the Year Awards (GAYA).

The purpose of GAYA is similar to that of GW itself: to recognize and acknowledge Georgia's wealth of outstanding writers and to acquaint them with the public and one another, thus continuing the literary heritage. GAYA was established in 1964 by the founders of the Dixie Council of Authors and Journalists. In 1984, that organization became the Council of Authors and Journalists (CAJ). Ten years later in 1994, the CAJ had diminished, having lost its drive and its leadership. Five months after GW was created, responsibility for GAYA was accepted as an integral part. GAYA has the distinction of being the oldest literary award in the Southeastern United States while reflecting the current publishing world.

Yearly award winners
 Georgia Author of the Year Awards 1997
 Georgia Author of the Year Awards 2004
 Pamela Jackson - 2006 winner

See also
 Literature of Georgia (U.S. state)

External links

Official Website
Content Writing Services
Georgia Author of the Year Awards
Managed Content Writing System

American literary awards
American writers' organizations
Non-profit organizations based in Georgia (U.S. state)
Kennesaw State University